During the Vietnam War, the U.S. confirmed 206 aircraft lost to North Vietnamese surface-to-air missiles.

However, some of the U.S. aircraft "crashed in flight accidents", in fact, were lost to S-75 missiles. When landing at an airfield in Thailand, one B-52 was heavily damaged by a SAM, rolled off the runway and exploded on mines that had been installed around the airfield for protection from enemy attacks; only one crewman survived. Subsequently, this B-52 was counted as "crashed in flight accidents". According to Dana Drenkowski and Lester W. Grau, the number of U.S. aircraft lost, confirmed by the U.S. is uncorroborated since the U.S. figures are also suspect. If a plane was badly damaged, but managed to land, the USAF did not normally count it as an aerial combat loss, even if it was too damaged to fly again.

During the Vietnam war, the Soviet Union deployed missile operators along with 95 S-75 systems and 7,658 missiles to the North Vietnamese.  From 1965 thru 1967 Soviet missilemen downed nearly 50 U.S. attack or reconnaissance jet aircraft.  6,806 missiles were launched or removed because they were outdated (including 5,800 launches). In total, the U.S. lost 3,374 fixed wing aircraft in combat during the war; in both North and South Vietnam. According to the North Vietnamese, 31% were shot down by S-75 missiles (1,046 aircraft, or 6 missiles per one kill); 60% were shot down by anti-aircraft guns; and 9% were shot down by MiG fighters. The S-75 missile system significantly improved the effectiveness of North Vietnamese anti-aircraft artillery, which used data from S-75 radar stations

The following is a list of 205 U.S. aircraft lost to surface-to-air missiles during the Vietnam War (confirmed by the U.S.)

References

Sources

Axe, David. Drone War Vietnam. Pen & Sword, Military. Great Britain. 2021.
Davies, Peter. F-105 Wild Weasel Vs SA-2 "Guideline" SAM Vietnam 1965-1973. Osprey 2011.
 
 Hobson, Chris. Vietnam Air Losses, United States Air Force, Navy and Marine Corps Fixed-Wing Aircraft Losses in Southeast Asia 1961-1973, 2001, Midland Publishing, Great Britain. .
Michel III, Marshal L. Clashes, Air Combat Over North Vietnam 1965-1972.'' Naval Institute Press. 1997.

Aircraft losses
US aircraft losses|Aircraft losses, U.S.